Steve or Steven Miller may refer to:

Arts and entertainment
Steve Miller (musician) (born 1943), leader of the Steve Miller Band
Steve Miller (columnist) (born c. 1944), writer and former Las Vegas city councilman
Steve Miller (artist) (born 1951), multi-media artist
Steve Miller (science fiction writer) (born 1950), author of stories and novels including the Liaden universe stories
Steve Miller (author) (born 1957), punk rock vocalist, journalist, and author
Steve Miller, British pianist with the late-1960s/early-1970s band Delivery
Steven C. Miller (born 1981), American screenwriter, editor, and director
Steven Miller (record producer) (born 1956), American record producer and executive
Steven Miller (actor) (born 1982), UK actor best known for role in British medical drama Casualty

Sports
Steve Miller (American football coach) (born 1943), college football coach at Carroll College, 1972–1976
Steven Miller (gridiron football) (born 1991), American-born Canadian football player
Steve Miller (linesman) (born 1972), Canadian National Hockey League linesman
Steven Miller (soccer) (born 1989), American soccer player
Steve Miller (defensive lineman) (born 1992), American football player
Steve Miller (athletics), President and CEO of the Professional Bowlers Association

Business
Steve Miller (business), CEO of Delphi Corporation
Steven L. Miller (born 1945), American oil industry businessman

Others
Steve Miller (game designer), designer of role-playing games
Steve Miller (Idaho politician), Republican Idaho State Representative
Steven T. Miller (born 1956), IRS acting commissioner
Steven Miller (bishop) (born 1957), Bishop of the Episcopal Diocese of Milwaukee
Steven J. Miller, mathematician

See also
Stephen Miller (disambiguation)